The Sunday Observance Act 1780 (21 Geo 3 c 49) was an Act of the Parliament of Great Britain.
Originally eight sections long, only sections 1 to 3 were still in force after the 1960s. These sections prohibited the use of any building or room for public entertainment or debate on a Sunday.

During November 1865, the National Sunday League (NSL) held a series of lectures for the general public entitled "Sunday Evenings for the People". This was fiercely opposed by the Lord's Day Observance Society (LDOS), who had the lectures cancelled after only four had been given. This was done by threatening the management of St Martin's Hall with legal action as lectures were forbidden under the Act.

In 1931, Millie Orpen, a solicitor's clerk, brought an action as a common informer against a cinema chain for opening on a succession of Sundays, contrary to the Sunday Observance Act 1780, s.1. Orpen claimed £25,000 against the cinema company and individual members of its board of directors. The claim was based on a forfeit of £200 per performance per defendant. The judge, Mr Justice Rowlatt, expressed some distaste for the proceedings. He found against the cinema chain, awarding Orpen £5,000, with costs, but found for the individual directors on the grounds that there was no evidence that they were guilty on any particular Sunday. Costs were awarded to the directors against Orpen. The judge granted a stay pending an appeal by the company. Later in the year, Orpen brought a claim against another chain, but was thwarted by a change in the law legalising Sunday opening for cinemas before her case could be decided.

Other legislation
This Act was affected by sections 1(1) and (3) of the Common Informers Act 1951. Its provisions were tightened by the Fairs and Markets Act 1850.

Its provisions were excluded in relation to certain activities by:
section 4 of the Sunday Entertainments Act 1932
section 9 of the Cinemas Act 1985
section 1 of the Sunday Theatre Act 1972
section 21 of the Deregulation and Contracting Out Act 1994
article 2 of the Deregulation (Sunday Dancing) Order 2000 (S.I. 2000/3372)
section 88 of the Licensing Act 1964

Case law
The following cases were decided in relation to the Act:
Baxter v. Langley (1868) LR 4 CP 21, 38 LJMC 1
Terry v. Brighton Aquarium Co (1875) LR 10 QB 306, 39 JP 519
Reid v. Wilson and Ward [1895] 1 QB 315, [1891 - 1894] All ER Rep 500
Williams v. Wright (1897) 13 TLR 551
Orpen v. Haymarket Capitol Ltd (1931) 145 LT 614, [1931] All ER 360
Orpen v. New Empire Ltd (1931) 48 TLR 8, 75 Sol Jo 763
R v. London County Council, ex parte Entertainments Protection Association Ltd [1931] 2 KB 215, 100 LJKB 760
Green v. Kursal (Southend on Sea) Estates Ltd [1937] 1 All ER, 81 Sol Jo 279
Houghten Le Touzel v. Mecca Ltd [1950] 2 KB 612, [1950] 1 All ER 638
Culley v. Harrison [1956] 2 QB 71, [1956] 2 All ER 254

Repeal

Sections 1 to 3 were repealed by the Licensing Act 2003 (with effect from 24 November 2005).

Sections 4 and 5 were repealed by the Statute Law Revision Act 1966.

Section 6 was repealed in part by section 2 of the Limitation of Actions and Costs Act 1842 and entirely by section 2 of the Public Authorities Protection Act 1893.

Section 7 was repealed by section 87 of, and Schedule 5 to, the Ecclesiastical Jurisdiction Measure 1963.

Section 8 was repealed by the Statute Law Revision Act 1966.

See also
 Sunday Observance Act for similar acts in Britain and Ireland in 1625, 1627, 1677, and 1695.
 Halsbury's Statutes

References

External links
The Sunday Observance Act 1780, as in force immediately before its repeal, from the National Archives.

Great Britain Acts of Parliament 1780
History of Christianity in the United Kingdom
Law about religion in the United Kingdom
Sunday